Techno International Batanagar, abbreviated as TIB, previously known as BIEMS, is a private engineering institution in Kolkata, West Bengal, India, which offers undergraduate (B.Tech) & (Diploma) four-year engineering degree courses in five disciplines & three-year polytechnic degree in two disciplines. The college is affiliated to Maulana Abul Kalam Azad University of Technology (formerly known as West Bengal University of Technology and its courses are approved by All India Council of Technical Education. It is an institution under the vision of Techno India Group.

Admission
Admission to the B.Tech courses on the basis of West Bengal Joint Entrance Examination and Joint Entrance Examination. Admission to other courses are based on criteria decided by the Academic Council of the University.

Departments
It offers admission to five branches in B.Tech and two branches for Diploma courses :
B.Tech in electrical engineering
B.Tech in computer science and engineering
B.Tech in electronics and communication engineering 
B.Tech in mechanical engineering
B.Tech in civil engineering

3 year Diploma course :
Diploma in civil engineering
Diploma in mechanical engineering

Equinox
Equinox is the cultural festival organized every year at the college.
 in 2019 Band performance by Rock on
in 2020: Performance by Sidhu (Siddhartha Ray) & Pota

Hostel 
There are separate hostels for boys and girls, which are located near the college. The boy's hostel is situated near by the Parbangla, Near Budge Budge ESI Hospital which is hardly five minutes from the college, and the girl's hostel Near By College

See also

References

External links 
Techno International Batanagar
TIB Online Semester Fees

Engineering colleges in West Bengal
Universities and colleges in South 24 Parganas district
Colleges affiliated to West Bengal University of Technology
Educational institutions established in 2012
2012 establishments in West Bengal